Kiss Kiss Kiss may refer to:

 "Kiss Kiss Kiss" (Ami Suzuki song), 2009
 "Kiss Kiss Kiss" (Beni song), 2009
 "Kiss! Kiss! Kiss!" (Buono song), 2008
 "Kiss Kiss Kiss" (KAT-TUN song), 2015
 "Kiss Kiss Kiss" (Yoko Ono song), 1980
 Kiss Kiss Kiss, a group that performed at the Montreux Jazz Festival 2010

See also 
 Kiss (disambiguation)
 Kiss Kiss (disambiguation)